Eskitaş is a village in the Kâhta District of Adıyaman Province in Turkey. The village is populated by Kurds of the Canbegan and Kawan tribes and had a population of 510 in 2021.

The hamlets of Kaynarca and Sırmalı are attached to the village.

References 

Kurdish settlements in Adıyaman Province
Villages in Kâhta District